USS Grapple (ARS-53) is a  in the United States Navy. Her home port is Norfolk, Virginia. On 13 July 2006 Grapple was decommissioned from US Navy service and converted to civilian operation by Military Sealift Command.  She was redesignated as USNS Grapple (T-ARS 53).

Role
Rescue and salvage ships render assistance to disabled ships, provide towing, salvage, diving, firefighting and heavy lift capabilities.

The mission of the rescue and salvage ships is fourfold: to debeach stranded vessels, heavy lift capability from ocean depths, towing of other vessels, and manned diving operations. For rescue missions, these ships are equipped with fire monitors forward and amidships which can deliver either firefighting foam or sea water. The salvage holds of these ships are outfitted with portable equipment to provide assistance to other vessels in dewatering, patching, supply of electrical power and other essential service required to return a disabled ship to an operating condition.

The Navy has responsibility for salvaging U.S. government-owned ships and, when it is in the best interests of the United States, privately owned vessels as well. The rugged construction of these steel-hulled ships, combined with speed and endurance, make these rescue and salvage ships well-suited for rescue/salvage operations of Navy and commercial shipping throughout the world. The versatility of this class of ship enables the U.S. Navy to render assistance to those in peril on the high seas.

Capabilities
Grapple is designed to perform combat salvage, lifting, towing, off-ship firefighting, manned diving operations, and emergency repairs to stranded or disabled vessels.

Salvage of disabled and stranded vessels
Disabled or stranded ships might require various types of assistance before retraction or towing can be attempted. In her  salvage hold, Grapple  carries transportable cutting and welding equipment, hydraulic and electric power sources, and de-watering gear. Grapple  also has salvage and machine shops, and hull repair materials to effect temporary hull repairs on stranded or otherwise damaged ships.

Retraction of stranded vessels
Stranded vessels can be retracted from a beach or reef by the use of Grapple's towing machine and propulsion. Additional retraction force can be applied to a stranded vessel through the use of up to six legs of beach gear, consisting of  STATO anchors, wire rope, chain, and salvage buoys. In a typical configuration, two legs of beach gear are rigged on board Grapple, and up to four legs of beach are rigged to the stranded vessel.

In addition to the standard legs of beach gear, Grapple carries 4 spring buoys. The spring buoys are carried beneath the port and starboard bridge wings. The spring buoys are used with beach gear legs rigged from a stranded vessel when deep water is found seaward of the stranded vessel.

Towing
Grapple's propulsion machinery provides a bollard pull (towing force at zero speed and full power) of 68 tons.

The centerpiece of Grapple's towing capability is an Almon A. Johnson Series 322 double-drum automatic towing machine. Each drum carries  of   drawn galvanized, 6×37 right-hand lay, wire-rope towing hawsers, with closed zinc-poured sockets on the bitter end. The towing machine uses a system to automatically pay in and pay out the towing howser to maintain a constant strain.

The automatic towing machine also includes a Series 400 traction winch that can be used with synthetic line towing hawsers up to 14 inches in circumference. The traction winch has automatic payout but only manual recovery.

The Grapple's caprail is curved to fairlead and prevent chafing of the towing hawser. It includes two vertical stern rollers to tend the towing hawser directly aft and two Norman pin rollers to prevent the towing hawser from sweeping forward of the beam at the point of tow.

Two tow bows provide a safe working area on the fantail during towing operations.

They traveled via the Suez Canal and arrived in the Gulf of Oman on 2 November 1987. At the time, the  trip was the longest distance three ships were towed by one.

Manned diving operations
Grapple has several diving systems to support different types of operations. Divers descend to diving depth on a diving stage that is lowered by one of two powered davits.

The diving locker is equipped with a double-lock hyperbaric chamber for recompression after deep dives or for the treatment of divers suffering from decompression sickness.

Grapple carries SCUBA equipment for dives that require greater mobility than is possible in tethered diving.

Recovery of submerged objects
In addition to her two main ground tackle anchors ( Navy standard stockless or  balanced-fluke anchors) Grapple can use equipment associated with her beach gear to lay a multi-point open water moor to station herself for diving and ROV operations.

A typical four-point-moor consists of an X pattern with four Stato Anchors at the outside corners and Grapple at the center, made fast to a spring buoy for the close end of each mooring leg with synthetic mooring lines.  Using her capstans, Grapple can shorten or lengthen the mooring line for each leg and change her position within the moor.

Grapple has a 7.5-ton-capacity boom on her forward kingpost and a 40-ton-capacity boom on her aft kingpost.

Heavy lift
Grapple has heavy lift system that consists of large bow and stern rollers, deck machinery, and tackle. The rollers serve as low-friction fairlead for the wire rope or chain used for the lift. The tackle and deck machinery provide up to 75 tons of hauling for each lift. The two bow rollers can be used together with linear hydraulic pullers to achieve a dynamic lift of 150 tons. The stern rollers can be used with the automatic towing machine to provide a dynamic lift of 150 tons. All four rollers can be used together for a dynamic lift of 300 tons or a static tidal lift of 350 tons.

Grapple also has two auxiliary bow rollers, which can support a 75-ton lift when used together.

Off-ship fire-fighting
Grapple has three manually operated fire monitors, one on the forward signal bridge, one on the aft signal bridge, and one on the forecastle, that can deliver up to 1,000 gallons per minute of seawater or aqueous film forming foam (AFFF) When originally built, Grapple had a fourth remotely controlled fire monitor mounted on her forward kingpost, but this was later removed. Grapple has a 3,600 gallon foam tank.

Emergency ship salvage material
In addition to the equipment carried by Grapple, the US Navy Supervisor of Salvage maintains a stock of additional emergency fly-away salvage equipment that can be deployed aboard the salvage ships to support a wide variety of rescue and salvage operations.

Awards
In 2000, Grapple won the Marjorie Sterrett Battleship Fund Award for the Atlantic Fleet.

Operations

Bodo, Norway 
In September of 1988, LST-1190 USS Boulder, ran aground on a shoal in a Norwegian fjord during Exercise: Teamwork.  The Grapple, along with two Norwegian tugs removed Boulder from the shoal.  As of February, 2019, Grapple is berthed behind Boulder and three Charleson-class vessels.

Adriatic Sea (F-16 recovery)

?

Botwood Harbor, Newfoundland, Canada
In July 2014, Grapple was in Newfoundland's Botwood Harbor for the body recovery from a 1940s plane wreck.

Corsica (Calvi)
In October 2012, Grapple supported research operation diving on a sea landing B-17 in WWII

Atlantic Ocean, 100km (62 miles) south of Nantucket
In November 1999, Grapple participated in the salvage operation of EgyptAir Flight 990.

St. Margarets Bay, Nova Scotia, Canada
In September 1998, Grapple helped in the recovery of Swissair Flight 111.

Mediterranean Sea
In January 2010, Grapple assisted in the search and recovery of aircraft fuselage pieces and "black-box" flight recorders following the crash of Ethiopian Airlines Flight 409.

Status
Grapple was placed in "Out of Service, in Reserve" status on October 1, 2016, and is stored in the Naval Inactive Ship Maintenance Facility at Philadelphia, Pennsylvania.

References

This article contains information from a United States Navy web site which is in the public domain.

External links

NHC - USS Grapple ship's histories 
DANFS - Grapple II (it also has Grasp ARS-51 material mixed into it making it misleading)

 

 

Safeguard-class salvage ships
1984 ships
Ships built by Peterson Builders